The Church of the Elevation of the Holy Cross is a Romanian Orthodox church in Pătrăuți Commune, Suceava County, Romania. Built in 1487, with Stephen III of Moldavia as ktitor, it is one of eight buildings that make up the churches of Moldavia UNESCO World Heritage Site, and is also listed as a historic monument by the country's Ministry of Culture and Religious Affairs.

References

Churches completed in 1487
Patrauti
15th-century Eastern Orthodox church buildings
Buildings and structures in Suceava County
Churches of Moldavia